NGC 509 is a lenticular galaxy approximately 87 million light-years away from Earth in the constellation of Pisces. It was discovered by German astronomer Albert Marth on October 1, 1864.

See also 
 List of NGC objects (1–1000)

References

External links 
 
 
 SEDS

Lenticular galaxies
Pisces (constellation)
509
5080
Astronomical objects discovered in 1864
Discoveries by Albert Marth